Events from the year 1822 in Canada.

Incumbents
Monarch: George IV

Federal government
Parliament of Lower Canada: 11th 
Parliament of Upper Canada: 8th

Governors
Governor of the Canadas: Robert Milnes
Governor of New Brunswick: George Stracey Smyth
Governor of Nova Scotia: John Coape Sherbrooke
Commodore-Governor of Newfoundland: Richard Goodwin Keats
Governor of Prince Edward Island: Charles Douglass Smith

Events
Louis-Joseph Papineau, a member of the legislative assembly since 1814, travels from Montreal to England to oppose an Act of Union identifying the French Canadians as a minority without language rights. The act is not passed in the British Parliament.

Births

January 9 – George William Allan, politician and 11th Mayor of Toronto (died 1901)
January 25 – William McDougall, lawyer, politician and a Father of Confederation (died 1905)
January 28 – Alexander Mackenzie, building contractor, newspaper editor, politician and 2nd Prime Minister of Canada (died 1892)
March 9 – Alexander Campbell, politician, Senator and 6th Lieutenant Governor of Ontario (died 1892)
March 12 – Albert James Smith, politician and Minister (died 1883)
April 25 – Marc-Amable Girard, politician, Senator and 2nd Premier of Manitoba (died 1892)
May 2 – Jacob Yost Shantz, Mennonite farmer, businessman and industrialist (died 1909)
May 4 – Charles Boucher de Boucherville, politician and 3rd Premier of Quebec (died 1915)
July 16 – Charles Sangster, poet (died 1893)
August 31 – Timothy Anglin, politician and Speaker of the House of Commons of Canada (died 1896)
October 2 – Matthew Crooks Cameron, lawyer, judge and politician (died 1887)
November 1 – Lemuel Owen, shipbuilder, banker, merchant, politician and Premier of Prince Edward Island (died 1912)
November 13 – Thomas Heath Haviland, politician (died 1895)

Full date unknown
Harvey William Burk, politician and farmer (died 1907)

Deaths
 December 17 – Peter Fidler, fur trader, mapmaker, explorer (born 1769)

References 

 
1822 in North America